The Glaveș is a left tributary of the river Sărata in Romania. It flows into the Sărata in Mihăilești.

References

Rivers of Romania
Rivers of Buzău County